Joseph Bertram Sleeman (21 June 1885 – 6 July 1970) was an Australian politician who was a Labor Party member of the Legislative Assembly of Western Australia from 1924 to 1959, representing the seat of Fremantle. He served as Speaker of the Legislative Assembly from 1939 to 1947.

Sleeman was born in the small country town of Inglewood, Victoria. He and his parents moved to Western Australia in 1895, and he attended school in Day Dawn, a mining town in the state's Mid West. After working for a period as a storeman in Leonora, Sleeman moved to Fremantle (the port city of Perth), where he began working as an organiser for the Shop Assistants Union. At the 1924 state election, he stood for the seat of Fremantle, and defeated the sitting Nationalist member, Frank Gibson. Following the 1939 election, Sleeman was elected Speaker of the Legislative Assembly, going on to serve until the Labor government's defeat at the 1947 election. Only two other speakers have served for longer periods – Sir James Lee-Steere and John Hearman. Sleeman continued in parliament until his retirement at the 1959 election, having spent nearly 35 years as the member for Fremantle. He died in July 1970, aged 85.

In 1992 Joe Sleeman Court, a housing complex on South Terrace, was named in Sleeman's honour and dedicated by the then MLA for Fremantle, Jim McGinty.

References

1885 births
1970 deaths
Australian Labor Party members of the Parliament of Western Australia
Australian trade unionists
Members of the Western Australian Legislative Assembly
Speakers of the Western Australian Legislative Assembly
People from Inglewood, Victoria
20th-century Australian politicians
People from Day Dawn